Suzanne and the Robbers  or  Suzanne and Her Robbers (French: Suzanne et ses brigands) is a 1949 French comedy film directed by Yves Ciampi and featuring René Dary, Suzanne Flon and Pierre Destailles.

The film's sets were designed by Lucien Carré.

Cast
 René Dary as René Seguin  
 Suzanne Flon as Suzanne Seguin  
 Pierre Destailles as L'aubergiste  
 Antoine Balpêtré as Bevardel 
 Louis Arbessier as Docteur Vinson  
 Catherine Damet as Jeanne  
 Marie Leduc as Mme Bavarde  
 Jacques Sommet as Jean Lucas  
 Spinelly
 Charles Vissières as Beauregard

References

Bibliography 
 James Monaco. The Encyclopedia of Film. Perigee Books, 1991.

External links 
 

1949 comedy films
French comedy films
1949 films
1940s French-language films
Films directed by Yves Ciampi
French black-and-white films
1940s French films